Henry Williams Jeffers (January 4, 1871  – July 17, 1953) was an American dairyman and Republican Party politician who served as Chairman of the New Jersey Republican State Committee.

Biography
Jeffers was born in Harford Township, Pennsylvania to Watson and Betsey Milburn (Oakley) Jeffers. He attended Wyoming Seminary in Kingston, Pennsylvania before going on to Cornell University, where he received a B.S. degree in 1899. He married Anna C. Adams on July 14, 1898.

Starting in his senior year at Cornell in 1898, Jeffers worked for the Walker-Gordon Dairy Farm, eventually becoming president in 1918. At Walker-Gordon, based in Plainsboro Township, New Jersey, Jeffers invented a number of technological innovations streamlining dairy production, including the Jeffers bacteriology counter, the Jeffers feed calculator, and the Rotolactor (a rotary milking parlor, a sort of "carousel" for cows, invented in 1930).

Jeffers served on the New Jersey Board of Agriculture from 1916 to 1927. During World War I he served on advisory boards for the United States Department of Agriculture and the American Food Administration under Herbert Hoover.

Jeffers was among the founders of Plainsboro Township, having petitioned the New Jersey Legislature to form a new municipality out of sections of Cranbury and South Brunswick townships. After the township was officially founded on May 6, 1919, Jeffers was elected the first mayor.

Jeffers was also active in Republican politics in New Jersey. He was selected as Chairman of the New Jersey Republican State Committee in 1935 when E. Donald Sterner was named State Highway Commissioner. He served until 1937.

Jeffers died on July 17, 1953 at Princeton Hospital in Princeton, New Jersey at the age of 82.

References

External links
Biographical information for Henry W. Jeffers from The Political Graveyard

1871 births
1953 deaths
Farmers from New Jersey
Chairmen of the New Jersey Republican State Committee
Cornell University alumni
Mayors of places in New Jersey
People from Plainsboro Township, New Jersey
People from Susquehanna County, Pennsylvania
New Jersey Republicans